LR2 may refer to:

 LR2 engine from General Motors
 Land Rover Freelander
 Lego Racers 2
 LR-2, a Japan Ground Self-Defense Force aircraft based on the Beechcraft Super King Air
 Lunatic Rave 2
 HSARI LR2, Chinese sniper anti-material rifle